Karim Youssef Fadl Younis (born December 24, 1956) is a former Palestinian prisoner and an Arab citizen of Israel, specifically from the village of 'Ara. The Israeli army captured him while he was in school on June 1, 1983, after he was convicted for the murder of an Israeli soldier, and released him on January 5, 2023. Prior to his release, he was considered the oldest Palestinian Israeli citizen in Israeli prisons and detention centers, and had been imprisoned for 40 years. He is also considered to have served the longest continuous sentence of any Palestinian.

Younis was convicted of the 1983 kidnapping and murder of Israeli soldier Avraham Bromberg in the Golan Heights. He was first sentenced to death by hanging, albeit his sentence was commuted to 40 years in prison by President of Israel Shimon Peres. According to the Palestinian Prisoner's Club, he was one of several Palestinian prisoners that were supposed to be released due to a deal with the courts, but this ended up falling through. The Israeli authorities were refusing to release Younis on the pretext that he holds Israeli citizenship. He was released in the early hours of the morning, and dropped off at a bus stop in Ra'anana. His family was not informed of his release or his location, however, he managed to get in contact with them via a passerby.

References 

1956 births
Living people
Palestinian hunger strikers
Palestinian people convicted of murder
Palestinian people imprisoned by Israel
People convicted of murder by Israel
Prisoners sentenced to death by Israel